René Paul Virgile Gaillard (born 28 July 1877 in Paris, date of death unknown) was a French footballer. He competed in the 1900 Olympic Games. In Paris, Gaillard won a silver medal as a member of Club Française club team.

References

External links

 Virgile Gaillard's profile at Sports Reference.com

1877 births
French footballers
Olympic silver medalists for France
Olympic footballers of France
Footballers at the 1900 Summer Olympics
Year of death missing
Olympic medalists in football
Medalists at the 1900 Summer Olympics
Association football midfielders
Footballers from Paris
Place of death missing